This is a list of museums in Bulgaria.

Museums

 Boris Georgiev City Art Gallery
 Bulgarian torpedo boat Drazki
 Earth and Man National Museum
 Etar Architectural-Ethnographic Complex
 Kaliopa House
 Konaka Museum
 Kordopulov House
 Krastata Kazarma
 Museum of Mosaics, Devnya
 National Art Gallery (Bulgaria)
 National Archaeological Museum (Bulgaria)
 National Gallery for Foreign Art
 National Historical Museum (Bulgaria)
 National Museum of Military History (Bulgaria)
 National Museum of Natural History (Bulgaria)
 National Polytechnical Museum
 National Transport Museum, Bulgaria
 Neolithic Dwellings Museum
 Nesebar Archaeological Museum
 Pazardzhik History Museum
 Pleven Panorama
 Pleven Regional Historical Museum
 Plovdiv Regional Ethnographic Museum
 Plovdiv Regional Historical Museum
 Radetzky (steamship)
 Rousse Regional Historical Museum
 Sofia Regional Historical Museum
 Svetlin Rusev Donative Exhibition
 Varna Aquarium
 Varna Archaeological Museum
 Wine Museum (Pleven)

See also

 List of museums
 Tourism in Bulgaria
 Culture of Bulgaria

References

Lists of buildings and structures in Bulgaria

Bulgaria education-related lists
Bulgaria
Museums
Bulgaria